Vellulla is a village, Metpally town in Jagtial district, Telangana, India, Vellulla is a Village in Metpalli Mandal, JagtialDistrict, Telangana State. Vellulla is 4.6 km distance from its Mandal Main Town Metpalli. Vellulla is 69.3 km distance from its District Main City Karimnagar. And 160 km distance from its State Main City Hyderabad.

Vellulla Yellamma temple 
The  Yellamma Thalli Temple, Vellulla is a temple of Ellamma devatha, the Hindu Goddess of cure all diseases.
One of the famous temple, and people will come from Jagithyal, Karimnagar, Nizamabad, Adilabad District.

References 

Villages in Jagtial district